Antonio Lupis (31 March 1620 – 11 December 1700) was a prolific Italian writer of the Baroque period.

Biography 
Born at Molfetta, the son of Flaminio Lupis and his wife Maria de Ceglia, both members of the local nobility, he spent his literary career in Venice. In Venice he became close friends with Lorenzo Tiepolo, the prominent senator, and with Giovanni Francesco Loredan, founder of the Accademia degli Incogniti, of which Lupis became a member.

He published numerous historical novels that found a welcoming public. In 1677 he published La Marchesa d'Hunsleij, overo l'Amazone scozzese ("The Marchioness of Huntly, or the Scottish Amazon"), a romanticised hagiographic biography of Lady Margaret Gordon, mother of the Scottish-born Capuchin friar John Forbes (1570/71–1606), that passed through eighteen printings before his death, and was reprinted as late as 1723. Turned into a drama by the poet Francesco Petrobelli, it continued to hold the stage for more than a century.

Some of his works turn upon moral reflections. He wrote a moralizing vita of his friend and patron Giovanni Francesco Loredano and a moral treatise titled Il Chiaro-oscuro di Pittura Morale. Lupis is the author of L'eroina veneta (1689), one of the first and most important biographies of Elena Cornaro Piscopia, the first woman to be awarded a higher university degree.

Several of his books, like Il Plico (1675), Il dispaccio di Mercurio (1681), La  segretaria morale (1687) and Pallade su le poste (1691), deal with artistic themes and give us interesting information about the painters and sculptors of his time. Of particular interest is a eulogy of his friend, the painter Evaristo Baschenis, written during the artist's lifetime and the letters sent to the sculptor Andrea Fantoni (1659-1734). A long letter sent to Luca Giordano documents the direct relationship between Lupis and the Neapolitan painter, whose "Passage of the Red Sea" in Santa Maria Maggiore, Bergamo, he describes in a letter dating from 1687. He was a great admirer and friend of the Swiss painter Ludovico David, who designed the frontispiece for Lupis' Corriere (1680).

Partial anthology

References

Sources

 
 Francesco Flora, vol. III, Milano 1965, ad vocem, Antonio Lupis.
 
 

1620 births
People from Molfetta
17th-century Italian male writers
Baroque writers
17th-century Italian novelists
Italian historical novelists
1700 deaths
Italian Roman Catholic writers
17th-century letter writers
Italian letter writers